Five Minutes to Tomorrow is a 2014 Japanese-Chinese romance suspense film directed by Isao Yukisada based on the Japanese novel of the same name by Takayoshi Honda. It was released in China on October 23, 2014.

Plot

The story starts with a flashback of two twin sisters RuoLan and RuMei. Ruo Lan meets at the local pool a young Japanese clock repairman: Ryo (played by Haruma Miura),

Cast
Cecilia Liu as Maggie/Michelle
Haruma Miura as Ryo
Joseph Chang as Tian Lun
Niu Ben
Yu Ya
Wang Zhihua
Sheng Kexin
Sheng Keyi
Zhang Yibai

Reception
As of October 28, the film had earned ¥8.35 million at the Chinese box office.

References

External links
 

2010s Japanese films
2014 romance films
Chinese romance films
Chinese suspense films
Films set in Shanghai
Films shot in Shanghai
Films directed by Isao Yukisada